Peoples is an unincorporated community in Jackson County, Kentucky, United States. Peoples had a post office until it closed on January 3, 2004. The community has the name of the local Peoples family.

References

Unincorporated communities in Jackson County, Kentucky
Unincorporated communities in Kentucky